The 1968–69 Athenian League season was the 46th in the history of Athenian League. The league consisted of 48 teams.

Premier Division

The division featured two new teams, both promoted from last season's Division One:
 Cheshunt  (1st)
 Wembley (2nd)

League table

Division One

The division featured 4 new teams:
 2 relegated from last season's Premier Division:
 Leyton (15th)
 Hemel Hempstead Town  (16th)
 2 promoted from last season's Division Two:
 Lewes (1st)
 Aylesbury United (2nd)

League table

Division Two

The division featured 2 new teams, all relegated from last season's Division One:
 Worthing (15th)
 Edgware Town (16th)

League table

References

1968–69 in English football leagues
Athenian League